The men's discus throw at the 2015 World Championships in Athletics was held at the Beijing National Stadium on 27 and 29 August.

Three time defending champion Robert Harting and his exuberant celebrations would not be here due to knee surgery, opening up opportunities for others.  Returning silver medalist Piotr Małachowski is the world leader hoping to move up a notch.  In the trials, it took Fedrick Dacres one toss to make an automatic qualifier, Małachowski took three attempts to do, but nobody else could get there.

In the finals, Małachowski took the lead on the second throw of the competition with a 65.09, the next thrower was Dacres who put out a 64.22.  Later in the round, 36-year-old Gerd Kanter threw 64.82 to take over second.  In the second round Małachowski solidified his lead by throwing 67.40 which turned out to be the gold medal winning throw.  Three throws later Apostolos Parellis threw 64.55 to take over third.  In the third round, Philip Milanov popped a 66.90 Belgian National Record to take over second place.  There were no other fireworks until the fifth round when Małachowski's Polish teammate,  Robert Urbanek got off a 65.18 to claim the bronze medal.

Records
Prior to the competition, the records were as follows:

Qualification standards

Schedule

Results

Qualification
Qualification: 65.00 m (Q) and at least 12 best (q) advanced to the final.

Final
The final was started at 19:50

References

Discus throw
Discus throw at the World Athletics Championships